(PanSTARRS) is a near-Earth object and periodic comet of the Jupiter family, that was radar imaged at distance of 2.2 million miles (3.5 million km, or 9 lunar distances) during a flyby of Earth in 2016.

The object had a unique history in that when it was discovered in January 2016 by a Pan-STARRS telescope, it was thought to be an asteroid and went by a provisional minor planet designation . Astronomer Denis Denisenko noted the body's orbit was very similar to 252P/LINEAR, which led to a follow up observation by the Lowell Discovery Telescope. The body showed a tail, identifying it as a probable comet and then named .

 was bigger than predicted when observed by astronomical radar; it was estimated to be perhaps 125 meters but was about 1 km in diameter. One reason it was hard to predict its size, is because it reflects about 3% of the light, a very low albedo.

 was said to be the closest approach of Earth by a comet since 1770 when Lexell's Comet is calculated to have passed within 1.4 million miles (2.2 million kilometers) of Earth according to Sky & Telescope magazine. The  flyby of Earth in 2016 was noted as the third closest approach of a comet to Earth. Another close approach by a comet in modern times was Comet IRAS–Araki–Alcock (aka C/1983 H1) in 1983.

After 's flyby in 2016, it is calculated that is the closest it will be to Earth for at least the next 150 years.  was noted as an opportunity to study comets more closely.

Summary
Example facts:
Discovered in January 2016, Earth flyby of 9 lunar distances in March 2016
Discovered as an asteroid but cometary activity detected
Expected to be 125 meters but turned out to be 1 km in size
Closest comet flyby since 1770 and 3rd closest recorded comet to Earth
Orbit similar to 252P/LINEAR
Very, very dark reflecting about 2-3 percent of visible light according to infrared observations
Rotates every 35–40 hours along its axis of rotation
Is the cometary representation of a charcoal briquette

Observations 
 was detected by the PS-1 telescope of Pan-STARRS in Hawaii, and it was also observed by the 4.3 meter aperture Discovery Channel Telescope in Arizona. NASA's infrared telescope (IRTF) observations revealed that  was reflecting only 2-3 percent of visible light.

The radar observations reported about a kilometer in diameter.

 was observed with a radar telescope in California over three days, which revealed various properties including a rotation rate of 35–40 hours along one axis.

In context
Near-Earth comets are much less common than asteroids. , according to statistics maintained by CNEOS, 18,837 NEOs were discovered: 107 near-Earth comets and 18,730 near-Earth asteroids. There are 1,929 NEOs that are classified as potentially hazardous asteroids (PHAs). Comets' typical properties are cause for various issues, including that they typically are very dark (in astronomical speak, they have a low albedo) which can hamper taking accurate measurements;  reflected approximately 3% of visible light which is darker than fresh asphalt.

Typical comets have much bigger orbits and have a lot of ice and dust that make their big tails.

There is a known bias towards detecting asteroids that reflect more visible light, and one way around this is try find them with infrared telescopes (i.e. detecting the objects' heat) although this comes with other challenges. There is a bias towards finding asteroids that are easier to detect. To better understand  it was observed with a combination of visible-light, infrared, and radar telescopes each with certain observation benefits. Infrared observations of the comet allowed for a determination that  was reflecting only 2-3 percent of visible light.

Comet 252P/LINEAR had its close approach on March 21, 2016, and coming within 3.3 million miles (5.2 million kilometers) made it the 5th closest approach by a comet according to CNN.

Meteor shower 
P/2016 BA14 may produce meteor shower on 21 March 2023 between the hours of 00–04 UT. Meteors would have a slow entry speed of 17 km/s.

Gallery

See also
List of asteroid close approaches to Earth
List of asteroid close approaches to Earth in 2016
Near-Earth object
C/2013 A1 (comet that passed close to planet Mars in 2014)
Near-Earth object#Near-Earth comets
55P/Tempel–Tuttle (Earth close approach in 1366 (calculated))

References

External links
NASA - BA14 scanned by radar
Discovery of Activity at Asteroid 2016 BA14 (Blog)
Historic (Pre 1900) close approaches of Earth by comets
 
A 'Tail' of Two Comets (NASA March 18, 2016)

Comets in 2016
Cometary object articles

20160122
Near-Earth objects in 2016